Ressler is a surname. Notable people with the surname include:

 Antony Ressler (born 1959), businessman
 Christian Ressler (born 1991), footballer
 Glenn Ressler (born 1943), footballer
 Larry Ressler (1848–1918), baseballer
 Norman W. Ressler (1873–1914), Medal of Honor recipient
 Oliver Ressler (born 1970), artist
 Robert Ressler (1937–2013), criminal profiler
 Susan Ressler (born 1949), American photographer

German-language surnames